Joie Ray is the name of:

 Joie Ray (athlete) (1894–1978), US American middle and long-distance runner
 Joie Ray (racing driver) (1923-2007), US American open-wheel and stock-car racer